is a Japanese politician and member of the House of Councillors from Kanagawa. A former executive of JP Morgan Securities Japan, he was elected to the House of Councillors in 2010 as a member of Your Party for the Kanagawa at-large district, and he later joined the Liberal Democratic Party House of Councillors parliamentary group.

Business career
Nakanishi was born in Tokyo, and after graduating from the faculty of law of the University of Tokyo, in 1988 he joined JP Morgan Securities Japan and in 2006 he rose to the position of Vice President.

Political career
Nakanishi ran for mayor of Yokohama in 2009 as an independent, but effectively supported by the Liberal Democratic Party and Komeito. He narrowly lost the election to Fumiko Hayashi, who was supported by the Democratic Party of Japan and the People's New Party. He beat Masahiko Okada of the Japanese Communist Party, who also ran.

In 2010 he ran and was elected to the House of Councillors as a member of Your Party for the Kanagawa at-large district, defeating Keiko Chiba, who was then the Justice Minister in the DPJ government of Naoto Kan. In 2011 it was reported that he was the third-wealthiest member of the upper house, with assets of ¥258.7 million. He became policy chief for Your Party. Your Party was dissolved in November 2014, and Nakanishi joined the Liberal Democratic Party upper house parliamentary group. In the 2016 regular election, he was re-elected from Kanagawa as an independent with LDP endorsement with the fourth-most votes behind candidates from LDP, DP and Kōmeitō, and – Kanagawa's fourth seat was the last prefectural district seat countrywide to be called on election night – received retroactive nomination (tsuika kōnin) from the LDP, in effect giving the party two seats from Kanagawa in one election for the first time.

References

External links

  Official homepage 

1964 births
Japanese politicians
Living people
University of Tokyo alumni